Munzur University (Turkish:Munzur Üniversitesi) is a university located in Tunceli, Turkey. It was established in 2008 as "Tunceli Üniversitesi". In time, the university has grown to have 7 faculties, 3 vocational schools, and 6 institutes.

It is named after a nearby mountain.

Faculties
 Faculty of Letters
 Faculty of Fine Arts
 Faculty of Economics and Administrative Science
 Faculty of Communication
 Faculty of Engineering
 Faculty of Sport Sciences
 Faculty of Aquaculture

References

Universities and colleges in Turkey
Educational institutions established in 2008
State universities and colleges in Turkey
2008 establishments in Turkey
Buildings and structures in Tunceli Province